Virginia's 65th House of Delegates district elects one of 100 seats in the Virginia House of Delegates, the lower house of the state's bicameral legislature. Located in central Virginia, District 65 represents Powhatan County as well as parts of Chesterfield County, Fluvanna County, and Goochland County. The seat has been held by Republican R. Lee Ware since 1998.

Elections

2017
In the November 2017 election, Democrat Francis Stevens, a police officer at Virginia's state capitol, ran against Ware, a former teacher.

List of delegates

References

65
Powhatan County, Virginia
Government in Chesterfield County, Virginia
Fluvanna County, Virginia
Goochland County, Virginia